Lieutenant Colonel Richard Crosse  DSO & Bar (1888–1970) was a British Army officer who commanded the 2nd Battalion The Oxfordshire and Buckinghamshire Light Infantry (The 52nd) on the Western Front. He was twice awarded the Distinguished Service Order. He later joined the Ulster Special Constabulary.

Military service
Richard Banestre Crosse was born in Macclesfield, Cheshire. Crosse was commissioned into the Oxfordshire Light Infantry in 1906 and was posted to the 2nd battalion known as the 52nd. The regiment became the Oxfordshire and Buckinghamshire Light Infantry in 1908. He was promoted to Lieutenant in 1909 and appointed adjutant of the 2nd Ox and Bucks (the 52nd) in March 1913. Crosse was awarded the DSO in January 1915. He was appointed Captain in May 1915 and remained adjutant to February 1916. He was appointed Brevet Major in June 1916.

On 8 July 1916 Crosse took over command of the 2nd Ox and Bucks (the 52nd). He led the battalion in many battles on the Western Front including on the Somme battlefield at Delville Wood, Guillemont and in the battle of Beaumont Hamel: a large attack on the Redan Ridge in the battle of the Ancre. Later battles included the Battle of Arras (1917) and the battle of the Selle. Crosse was awarded a Bar to the DSO in February 1918. He was wounded on 23 August 1918 and rejoined the battalion on 2 October 1918 having discharged himself from hospital and he continued treatment through the regimental medical officer. He was Mentioned in Despatches four times. Crosse was appointed a Chevalier of the French Legion of Honour in 1917. During the 1st World War Crosse declined further promotion in order to stay with his battalion which he remained in command of to June 1919. He retired from the Army in 1923 and joined the Ulster Special Constabulary in 1924. Crosse wrote a book on the history of his former regiment: titled A Short History of the Oxfordshire and Buckinghamshire Light Infantry 1741 - 1922. He died in Crewe, Cheshire.

References

The Oxfordshire and Buckinghamshire Light Infantry (the 43rd/52nd Regiment of Foot) Philip Booth (1971)
History of the 43rd and 52nd (Oxfordshire and Buckinghamshire) Light Infantry Regiment in the Great War 1914-1918 Vol 11 The 52nd Light Infantry in France and Belgium Simon Harris (2012)
The Story of the Oxfordshire and Buckinghamshire Light Infantry (The old 43rd and 52nd Regiments) Sir Henry Newbolt (1915)
The Somme Gary Sheffield (2004)

1888 births
1970 deaths
Companions of the Distinguished Service Order
Oxfordshire and Buckinghamshire Light Infantry officers
Ulster Special Constabulary officers
People from Macclesfield
Military personnel from Cheshire
British Army personnel of World War I